Emmet Malone is the Industry and Employment correspondent for the daily broadsheet newspaper, The Irish Times.

He formerly served as a football correspondent. 

Malone attended University College Dublin and Dublin City University. He began his career as a freelance before joining the Irish Times staff in 1996. In 2001, he was appointed as the paper's football correspondent.  He covers all major football competitions for the paper.  In addition, he appears regularly on radio (RTÉ Radio and Newstalk).

References

alumni of Dublin City University
alumni of University College Dublin
date of birth missing (living people)
Irish sports journalists
living people
year of birth missing (living people)